This is a list of airlines currently operating in Belgium.

Scheduled airlines

Charter airlines

Cargo airlines

See also
 List of defunct airlines of Belgium
 List of airlines
 List of defunct airlines of Europe

References

Belgium

Airlines
Airlines
Belgium